Parviz Fannizadeh (January 27, 1938 – February 24, 1980) was an Iranian actor, film and television star. He was one of Iran's first method actors. Fanizadeh is best known for his roles as Mash Ghaasem in My Uncle Napoleon aka  Daii jan Napelon  and Hekmati in ِDownpour.

Career
Fannizadeh was born and raised in Tehran. He had a passion for acting and started his career at an early age. He graduated from the Iranian Academy of the Dramatic Arts in 1961. In 1966 he played his first role. He won the best actor prize at the Fifth Iranian National Film Festival "Sepas" in 1973 for portraying Mr. Hekmati in Bahram Bayzai's film Downpour (Ragbar) (1972). He acted in several plays on theatre stage including plays directed by Hamid Samandarian.

Death
In 1979 he was found dead at the age of 42 in his home in Tehran.

Family
He had two daughters, Donya and Hasti. Donya Fannizadeh died of cancer on December 28, 2016 at the age of 49 at "Day Hospital" in Tehran.

Filmography
Sorkhpustha (1979)
Ghadeghan (1978)
Daii jan Napelon (1976) as Mash Ghasem, directed by Nasser Taghvai
Gavaznha (The Deer) (1976), directed by Masoud Kimiai
Sham-e akhar (The Last Supper) (1976), directed by Shahyar Ghanbari
Boof-e koor (The Blind Owl) (1975), directed by Kioumars Derambakhsh
Soltan-e Sahebgharan (1974) (mini) TV Series .... as Malijak, directed by Ali Hatami
Tangsir (1974), directed by Amir Naderi
Gharibe (1972), directed by Shapoor Gharib
Ragbar (Downpour) (1971) as Mr. Hekmati, directed by Bahram Bayzai
Gāv (The Cow) (1969), directed by Dariush Mehrjui
Khesht va Ayeneh (1966), directed by Ebrahim Golestan

Theatre
Few of his works as an actor on theatre stage:
 Morts sans sépulture, Jean-Paul Sartre, directed by Hamid Samandarian, 1964 and 1979
 The Glass Menagerie, Tennessee Williams, directed by Hamid Samandarian, 1964
 The Doctor in Spite of Himself, Molière, directed by Hamid Samandarian, 1965
 Sei personaggi in cerca d'autore, Luigi Pirandello, directed by Pari Saberi, co-starring Forough Farrokhzad

External links

 Photograph of Parviz Fannizadeh:
 Photograph of Parviz Fannizadeh's grave:

References

1938 births
1980 deaths
People from Tehran
Deaths from tetanus
Male actors from Tehran
Iranian male film actors
Iranian male television actors
20th-century Iranian male actors